The 2016 GPL Spring was the ninth edition of the Garena Premier League, a Riot Games-organised tournament for League of Legends, the multiplayer online battle arena video game.

Format
   Group Stage (Apr 6-8)
  Single round robin
  All matches are best of one
'  Knockout Stage (Apr 9-10)
  Single Elimination
  All matches are best of five

Participants
6 teams from 6 countries/areas

Rosters

Results

Group stage

Double Round Robin. Top 4 teams advance to Bracket Stage.

Bracket Stage
 1st place team of Group Stage chooses between 3rd and 4th place to be their semifinal opponent (BKT chooses KLH)
 Matches are best of five.

Final standings

References

External links
 Official website

Sports leagues in Asia
League of Legends competitions